The Mayor of Mackenzie officiates over the Mackenzie District of New Zealand's South Island.

Anne Munro has been the current mayor of Mackenzie since 2022.

List of mayors
There have been 6 mayors of Mackenzie.

References

Mackenzie
Mackenzie
Mackenzie District
Macken